Leptoconus is a subgenus  of sea snails, marine gastropod mollusks in the genus Conus, family Conidae, the cone snails and their allies.

In the latest classification of the family Conidae by Puillandre N., Duda T.F., Meyer C., Olivera B.M. & Bouchet P. (2015), Leptoconus has become a subgenus of Conus as Conus (Leptoconus) Swainson, 1840 (type species: Conus amadis Gmelin, 1791) represented as Conus Linnaeus, 1758

Distinguishing characteristics
The Tucker & Tenorio 2009 taxonomy distinguishes Leptoconus from Conus in the following ways:

 Genus Conus sensu stricto Linnaeus, 1758
 Shell characters (living and fossil species)
The basic shell shape is conical to elongated conical, has a deep anal notch on the shoulder, a smooth periostracum and a small operculum. The shoulder of the shell is usually nodulose and the protoconch is usually multispiral. Markings often include the presence of tents except for black or white color variants, with the absence of spiral lines of minute tents and textile bars.
Radular tooth (not known for fossil species)
The radula has an elongated anterior section with serrations and a large exposed terminating cusp, a non-obvious waist, blade is either small or absent and has a short barb, and lacks a basal spur.
Geographical distribution
These species are found in the Indo-Pacific region.
Feeding habits
These species eat other gastropods including cones.

 Subgenus Leptoconus Swainson, 1840
Shell characters (living and fossil species)
The shell is turbinate to elongated conical in shape, and the spire is either concave or straight and turriculated in profile.  The protoconch has 1.5 whorls.  The shell is ornamented with nodules which may persist or die out early.  The anal notch is deep.  The color pattern includes spiral rows of minute tents, however textile bars are absent.  The periostracum is smooth, and the operculum is small.
Radular tooth (not known for fossil species)
The anterior section of the radular tooth is significantly longer than the length of posterior section.  A basal spur is usually absent, and the barb and blade are short.  The waist is not obvious.  The radular tooth has serrations, and a terminating cusp.
Geographical distribution
These species are found in the Indo-Pacific region.
Feeding habits
These species are molluscivorus, meaning that these cone snails prey on other mollusks.

Species list
This list of species is based on the information in the World Register of Marine Species (WoRMS) list. Species within the genus Leptoconus include:
 Leptoconus (Phasmoconus) dusaveli H. Adams, 1872 accepted as Checked: verified by a taxonomic editorConus dusaveli (H. Adams, 1872)
 Leptoconus abbotti (Clench, 1942): synonym of Conus jucundus G. B. Sowerby III, 1887
 Leptoconus amadis (Gmelin, 1791): synonym of  Conus amadis Gmelin, 1791
 Leptoconus ammiralis (Linnaeus, 1758): synonym of  Conus ammiralis Linnaeus, 1758
 Leptoconus biraghii G. Raybaudi, 1992: synonym of Conus biraghii (G. Raybaudi, 1992)
 Leptoconus dusaveli H. Adams, 1872: synonym of Conus dusaveli (H. Adams, 1872)
 Leptoconus gernanti Petuch, 1975: synonym of Conus ambiguus Reeve, 1844
 Leptoconus hamanni (Fainzilber & Mienis, 1986): synonym of  Conus hamanni Fainzilber & Mienis, 1986
 Leptoconus illawarra Garrard, 1961: synonym of Conus sydneyensis G. B. Sowerby III, 1887
 Leptoconus kawamurai (Habe, 1962): synonym of  Conus kawamurai Habe, 1962
 Leptoconus locumtenens (Blumenbach, 1791): synonym of  Conus locumtenens Blumenbach, 1791
 Leptoconus mappa: synonym of Conus mappa Lightfoot, 1786
 Leptoconus milneedwardsi (Jousseaume, 1894): synonym of  Conus milneedwardsi Jousseaume, 1894
 Leptoconus temnes Iredale, 1930: synonym of Conus ammiralis Linnaeus, 1758

References

Further reading 
 Kohn A. A. (1992). Chronological Taxonomy of Conus, 1758-1840". Smithsonian Institution Press, Washington and London.
 Monteiro A. (ed.) (2007). The Cone Collector 1: 1-28.
 Berschauer D. (2010). Technology and the Fall of the Mono-Generic Family The Cone Collector 15: pp. 51-54
 Puillandre N., Meyer C.P., Bouchet P., and Olivera B.M. (2011), Genetic divergence and geographical variation in the deep-water Conus orbignyi complex (Mollusca: Conoidea)'', Zoologica Scripta 40(4) 350-363.

External links
 To World Register of Marine Species
  Gastropods.com: Conidae setting forth the genera recognized therein.

Conidae
Gastropod subgenera